Last Chance Lottery was a 1997 UK TV gameshow broadcast on Channel 4, presented by Irish comedian Patrick Kielty. The show's current director is Stephen Stewart. It was produced by Green Inc. Productions.

References

External links

1997 British television series debuts
1997 British television series endings
1990s British game shows
Channel 4 game shows
English-language television shows